Shetland, also called the Shetland Islands and formerly Zetland, is a subarctic archipelago lying between Orkney, the Faroe Islands, and Norway. It is the northernmost region of the United Kingdom.   

They form part of the border between the Atlantic Ocean to the west and the North Sea to the east. The islands comprise the Shetland constituency of the Scottish Parliament. The local authority, the Shetland Islands Council, is one of the 32 council areas of Scotland. The islands' administrative centre and only burgh is Lerwick, which has been the capital of Shetland since 1708, before which time the capital was Scalloway.

The archipelago has an oceanic climate, complex geology, rugged coastline, and many low, rolling hills.
It is one of 16 inhabited islands in Shetland.  

Humans have lived in Shetland since the Mesolithic period. Picts are known to have been the original inhabitants of the islands, before the Norse conquest and subsequent colonisation in the Early Middle Ages. During the 10th to 15th centuries, the islands formed part of the Kingdom of Norway until they were annexed into the Kingdom of Scotland due to a royal dispute involving the payment of a dowry. In 1707, when Scotland and England united to form the Kingdom of Great Britain, trade between Shetland and continental Northern Europe decreased. The discovery of North Sea oil in the 1970s significantly boosted Shetland's economy, employment and public-sector revenues. Fishing has always been an important part of the islands’ economy.

The local way of life reflects the Norse heritage of the isles, including the Up Helly Aa fire festivals and a strong musical tradition, especially the traditional fiddle style. Almost all place names in the islands also have Norse origin. The islands have produced a variety of prose writers and poets, who have often written in the distinctive Shetland dialect. Numerous areas on the islands have been set aside to protect the local fauna and flora, including a number of important seabird nesting sites. The Shetland pony and Shetland Sheepdog are two well-known Shetland animal breeds. Other animals with local breeds include the Shetland sheep, cow, goose, and duck. The Shetland pig, or grice, has been extinct since about 1930.

The islands' motto, which appears on the Council's coat of arms, is "" (“By law shall the land be built"). The phrase is of Old Norse origin, is mentioned in Njáls saga, and was likely borrowed from provincial Norwegian laws such as the Frostathing Law.

Etymology 

Another possibility is that the first syllable is derived from the name of an ancient Celtic tribe.

Scholars have inferred that both of these references are to islands in the Shetland group. Another possible early written reference to the islands is Tacitus' report in Agricola in 98 CE. After he described the Roman discovery and conquest of Orkney, he added that the Roman fleet had seen "Thule, too". In early Irish literature, Shetland is referred to as  — "the Isles of Cats" (meaning the island inhabited by the tribe called Cat). This may have been the pre-Norse inhabitants' name for the islands. Cat was the name of a Pictish people who occupied parts of the northern Scotland (see Kingdom of Cat); and their name survives in the names of the county of Caithness and in the Scottish Gaelic name for Sutherland, which means "among the Cats".

It occurs in a letter written by Harald, earl of Orkney, Shetland and Caithness, in c.1190. By 1431, the islands were being referred to as Hetland, after various intermediate transformations. It is possible that the Pictish "cat" sound contributed to this Norse name.

Gradually, the Scandinavian Norn language previously spoken by the inhabitants of the islands was replaced by the Shetland language and  became . The initial letter is the Middle Scots letter, yogh, the pronunciation of which is almost identical to the original Norn sound, . When the use of the letter yogh was discontinued, it was often replaced by the similar-looking letter z (which at the time was usually rendered with a curled tail: ⟨ʒ⟩) hence , the form used in the name of the pre-1975 county council. This is also the source of the ZE postcode used for Shetland.

Most of the individual islands have Norse names, although the derivations of some are obscure and may represent pre-Norse, Pictish, or even pre-Celtic names or elements.

Geography and geology 

Lerwick, the capital and largest settlement, has a population of 6,958 and about half of the archipelago's total population of 22,920 people live within  of the town.

Scalloway on the west coast, which was the capital until 1708, has a population of fewer than 1,000 people.

Only 16 of about 100 islands are inhabited. The main island of the group is known as Mainland. The next largest are Yell, Unst, and Fetlar, which lie to the north, and Bressay and Whalsay, which lie to the east. East and West Burra, Muckle Roe, Papa Stour, Trondra, and Vaila are smaller islands to the west of Mainland.

The uninhabited islands include Mousa, known for the Broch of Mousa, the finest preserved example in the world of an Iron Age broch; Noss to the east of Bressay, which has been a national nature reserve since 1955; St Ninian's Isle, connected to the Mainland by the largest active tombolo in the United Kingdom; and Out Stack, the northernmost point of the British Isles. Shetland's location means that it provides a number of such records: Muness is the most northerly castle in the United Kingdom and Skaw the most northerly settlement.

The geology of Shetland is complex, with numerous faults and fold axes. These islands are the northern outpost of the Caledonian orogeny, and there are outcrops of Lewisian, Dalradian and Moine metamorphic rocks with histories similar to their equivalents on the Scottish mainland. There are also Old Red Sandstone deposits and granite intrusions. The most distinctive feature is the ophiolite in Unst and Fetlar which is a remnant of the Iapetus Ocean floor made up of ultrabasic peridotite and gabbro.

Much of Shetland's economy depends on the oil-bearing sediments in the surrounding seas.

The Pleistocene glaciations entirely covered the islands. During that period, the Stanes of Stofast, a 2000-tonne glacial erratic, came to rest on a prominent hilltop in Lunnasting.

Shetland has a national scenic area which, unusually, includes a number of discrete locations: Fair Isle, Foula, South West Mainland (including the Scalloway Islands), Muckle Roe, Esha Ness, Fethaland and Herma Ness. The total area covered by the designation is 41,833 ha, of which 26,347 ha is marine (i.e. below low tide).

In October 2018, legislation came into force in Scotland to prevent public bodies, without good reason, showing Shetland in a separate box in maps, as had often been the practice. The legislation requires the islands to be "displayed in a manner that accurately and proportionately represents their geographical location in relation to Scotland", so as make clear the islands' real distance from other areas.

Climate 
Shetland has an oceanic temperate maritime climate (Köppen: Cfb), bordering on, but very slightly above average in summer temperatures, the subpolar variety, with long but cool winters and short warm summers. The climate all year round is moderate owing to the influence of the surrounding seas, with average night-time low temperatures a little above  in January and February and average daytime high temperatures of near  in July and August. The frost-free period may be as little as three months. In contrast, winters are considerably milder than those expected in nearby continental areas, even comparable to winter temperatures of many parts of England and Wales much further south.

The general character of the climate is windy and cloudy with at least  of rain falling on more than 250 days a year. Snowfall is usually confined to the period November to February, and snow seldom lies on the ground for more than a day. Fog is common during summer due to the cooling effect of the sea on mild southerly airflows.

Because of the islands' latitude, on clear winter nights the northern lights can sometimes be seen in the sky, while in summer there is almost perpetual daylight, a state of affairs known locally as the "simmer dim". Annual bright sunshine averages 1110 hours, and overcast days are common.

Prehistory 

Due to the practice, dating to at least the early Neolithic, of building in stone on virtually treeless islands, Shetland is extremely rich in physical remains of the prehistoric eras and there are over 5,000 archaeological sites all told. A midden site at West Voe on the south coast of the Mainland, dated to 4320–4030 BC, has provided the first evidence of Mesolithic human activity in Shetland. The same site provides dates for early Neolithic activity and finds at Scord of Brouster in Walls have been dated to 3400 BC. "Shetland knives" are stone tools that date from this period made from felsite from Northmavine.

Pottery shards found at the important site of Jarlshof also indicate that there was Neolithic activity there although the main settlement dates from the Bronze Age. This includes a smithy, a cluster of wheelhouses and a later broch. The site has provided evidence of habitation during various phases right up until Viking times. Heel-shaped cairns, are a style of chambered cairn unique to Shetland, with a particularly large example in Vementry.

Numerous brochs were erected during the Iron Age. In addition to Mousa there are significant ruins at Clickimin, Culswick, Old Scatness and West Burrafirth, although their origin and purpose is a matter of some controversy. The later Iron Age inhabitants of the Northern Isles were probably Pictish, although the historical record is sparse. Hunter (2000) states in relation to King Bridei I of the Picts in the sixth century AD: "As for Shetland, Orkney, Skye and the Western Isles, their inhabitants, most of whom appear to have been Pictish in culture and speech at this time, are likely to have regarded Bridei as a fairly distant presence". In 2011, the collective site, "The Crucible of Iron Age Shetland", including Broch of Mousa, Old Scatness and Jarlshof, joined the UKs "Tentative List" of World Heritage Sites.

History

Scandinavian colonisation 

The expanding population of Scandinavia led to a shortage of available resources and arable land there and led to a period of Viking expansion so the Norse gradually shifted their attention from plundering to invasion. Shetland was colonised during the late 8th and 9th centuries, the fate of the existing indigenous Pictish population being uncertain. Modern Shetlanders still retain the Norse DNA with many family trees showing the Norse patronymic system(-sson/son, -dottir/daughter). Modern DNA studies such as the Viking Health Study are severely flawed as they only account for a tiny fraction of the population.

Vikings then used the islands as a base for pirate expeditions to Norway and Scotland. In response, Norwegian king Harald Hårfagre ("Harald Fair Hair") annexed Orkney and Shetland in 875. Rognvald Eysteinsson received Orkney and Shetland as an earldom from Harald as reparation for the death of his son in battle in Scotland, and then passed the earldom on to his brother Sigurd the Mighty.

The islands converted to Christianity in the late 10th century. King Olaf I Tryggvasson summoned the jarl Sigurd the Stout during a visit to Orkney and said, "I order you and all your subjects to be baptised. If you refuse, I'll have you killed on the spot and I swear I will ravage every island with fire and steel". Unsurprisingly, Sigurd agreed and the islands became Christian at a stroke. Unusually, from c. 1100 onwards the Norse jarls owed allegiance both to Norway and to the Scottish crown through their holdings as Earls of Caithness.

In 1194, when Harald Maddadsson was Earl of Orkney and Shetland, a rebellion broke out against King Sverre Sigurdsson of Norway. The Eyjarskeggjar ("Island Beardies") sailed for Norway but were beaten in the Battle of Florvåg near Bergen. After his victory King Sverre placed Shetland under direct Norwegian rule, a state of affairs that continued for nearly two centuries.

Increased Scottish interest 
From the mid-13th century onwards Scottish monarchs increasingly sought to take control of the islands surrounding their seas. The process was begun in earnest by Alexander II and was continued by his successor Alexander III. This strategy eventually led to an invasion of Scotland by Haakon IV Haakonsson, King of Norway. His fleet assembled in Bressay Sound before sailing for Scotland. After the stalemate of the Battle of Largs, Haakon retreated to Orkney, where he died in December 1263, entertained on his deathbed by recitations of the sagas. His death halted any further Norwegian expansion in Scotland and following this ill-fated expedition, the Hebrides and Mann were yielded to the Kingdom of Scotland as a result of the 1266 Treaty of Perth, although the Scots recognised continuing Norwegian sovereignty over Orkney and Shetland.

Absorption by Scotland 

In the 14th century, Orkney and Shetland remained a Norwegian possession, but Scottish influence was growing. Jon Haraldsson, who was murdered in Thurso in 1231, was the last of an unbroken line of Norse jarls, and thereafter the earls were Scots noblemen of the houses of Angus and St Clair. On the death of Haakon VI in 1380, Norway formed a political union with Denmark, after which the interest of the royal house in the islands declined. In 1469, Shetland was pledged by Christian I, in his capacity as King of Norway, as security against the payment of the dowry of his daughter Margaret, betrothed to James III of Scotland. As the money was never paid, the connection with the Crown of Scotland became permanent. In 1470, William Sinclair, 1st Earl of Caithness, ceded his title to James III, and the following year the Northern Isles were directly absorbed by the Crown of Scotland, an action confirmed by the Parliament of Scotland in 1472. Nonetheless, Shetland's connection with Norway has proved to be enduring.

From the early 15th century onward Shetlanders sold their goods through the Hanseatic League of German merchantmen. The Hansa would buy shiploads of salted fish, wool and butter, and import salt, cloth, beer and other goods. The late 16th century and early 17th century were dominated by the influence of the despotic Robert Stewart, Earl of Orkney, who was granted the islands by his half-sister Mary Queen of Scots, and his son Patrick. The latter commenced the building of Scalloway Castle, but after his imprisonment in 1609, the Crown annexed Orkney and Shetland again until 1643, when Charles I granted them to William Douglas, 7th Earl of Morton. These rights were held on and off by the Mortons until 1766, when they were sold by James Douglas, 14th Earl of Morton to Laurence Dundas.

18th and 19th centuries 

The trade with the North German towns lasted until the 1707 Act of Union, when high salt duties prevented the German merchants from trading with Shetland. Shetland then went into an economic depression, as the local traders were not as skilled in trading salted fish. However, some local merchant-lairds took up where the German merchants had left off, and fitted out their own ships to export fish from Shetland to the Continent. For the independent farmers of Shetland this had negative consequences, as they now had to fish for these merchant-lairds.

Smallpox afflicted the islands in the 17th and 18th centuries (as it did all of Europe), but as vaccines became available after 1800, health improved. The islands were very badly hit by the potato famine of 1846 and the government introduced a Relief Plan for the islands under the command of Captain Robert Craigie of the Royal Navy who stayed in Lerwick to oversee the project 1847–1852. During this period Craigie also did much to improve and increase roads in the islands.

Population increased to a maximum of 31,670 in 1861. However, British rule came at a price for many ordinary people as well as traders. The Shetlanders' nautical skills were sought by the Royal Navy. Some 3,000 served during the Napoleonic wars from 1800 to 1815 and press gangs were rife. During this period 120 men were taken from Fetlar alone, and only 20 of them returned home. By the late 19th century 90% of all Shetland was owned by just 32 people, and between 1861 and 1881 more than 8,000 Shetlanders emigrated. With the passing of the Crofters' Act in 1886 the Liberal prime minister William Gladstone emancipated crofters from the rule of the landlords. The Act enabled those who had effectively been landowners' serfs to become owner-occupiers of their own small farms. By this time fishermen from Holland, who had traditionally gathered each year off the coast of Shetland to fish for herring, triggered an industry in the islands that boomed from around 1880 until the 1920s when stocks of the fish began to dwindle. The production peaked in 1905 at more than a million barrels, of which 708,000 were exported.

The Local Government (Scotland) Act 1889 established a uniform system of county councils in Scotland and realigned the boundaries of many of Scotland's counties: Zetland County Council, which was created in 1890, was established at County Buildings in Lerwick.

20th century 

During World War I, many Shetlanders served in the Gordon Highlanders, a further 3,000 served in the Merchant Navy, and more than 1,500 in a special local naval reserve. The 10th Cruiser Squadron was stationed at Swarbacks Minn (the stretch of water to the south of Muckle Roe), and during a single year from March 1917 more than 4,500 ships sailed from Lerwick as part of an escorted convoy system. In total, Shetland lost more than 500 men, a higher proportion than any other part of Britain, and there were further waves of emigration in the 1920s and 1930s.

During World War II, a Norwegian naval unit nicknamed the "Shetland Bus" was established by the Special Operations Executive in the autumn of 1940 with a base first at Lunna and later in Scalloway to conduct operations around the coast of Norway. About 30 fishing vessels used by Norwegian refugees were gathered and the Shetland Bus conducted covert operations, carrying intelligence agents, refugees, instructors for the resistance, and military supplies. It made over 200 trips across the sea, and Leif Larsen, the most highly decorated allied naval officer of the war, made 52 of them. Several RAF airfields and sites were also established at Sullom Voe and several lighthouses suffered enemy air attacks.

Oil reserves discovered in the later 20th century in the seas both east and west of Shetland have provided a much-needed alternative source of income for the islands. The East Shetland Basin is one of Europe's prolific petroleum provinces. As a result of the oil revenue and the cultural links with Norway, a small Home Rule movement developed briefly to recast the constitutional position of Shetland. It saw as its models the Isle of Man, as well as Shetland's closest neighbour, the Faroe Islands, an autonomous dependency of Denmark.

The population stood at 17,814 in 1961.

Economy 

Today, the main revenue producers in Shetland are agriculture, aquaculture, fishing, renewable energy, the petroleum industry (crude oil and natural gas production), the creative industries and tourism. Unst also has a rocket launch site called SaxaVord Spaceport (previously known as Shetland Space Centre). A February 2021 news item indicated that a rocket manufacturer from Germany, HyImpulse Technologies, planned to launch spacecraft powered by hydrogen from the Spaceport, starting in 2023. During the previous month, the Space Centre had filed plans with Council for a "satellite launch facility and associated infrastructure".

As of February 2021, information on the Promote Shetland Web site indicated that "Shetland is less reliant on tourism than many Scottish islands" and that oil was an important sector of the economy. The "process of gradually transitioning from oil to clean renewable energy ... production of clean hydrogen" was also emphasized. Fishing remained the primary sector and was expected to grow.

Fishing 

Fishing is central to the islands' economy today, with the total catch being  in 2009, valued at over £73.2 million. Atlantic mackerel makes up more than half of the catch in Shetland by weight and value, and there are significant landings of haddock, cod, herring, whiting, monkfish and shellfish.

A report published in October 2020 was optimistic about the future of this sector in: "With new fish markets in Lerwick and Scalloway, and plans to expand its aquaculture offerings in Yell, Shetland is preparing for more growth in its biggest industry".

As of February 2021, the Promote Shetland Web site stated that "more fish is landed in Shetland than in England, Wales and Northern Ireland combined', that "Shetland harvests 40,000 tonnes of salmon a year, worth £180 million" and that "6,500 tonnes of mussels are grown in Shetland, more than 80 per cent of the total Scottish production".

Energy and fossil fuels 

Oil and gas were first landed in 1978 at Sullom Voe, which has subsequently become one of the largest terminals in Europe. Taxes from the oil have increased public sector spending on social welfare, art, sport, environmental measures and financial development. Three quarters of the islands' workforce is employed in the service sector, and the Shetland Islands Council alone accounted for 27.9% of output in 2003. Shetland's access to oil revenues has funded the Shetland Charitable Trust, which in turn funds a wide variety of local programmes. The balance of the fund in 2011 was £217 million, i.e., about £9,500 per head.

In January 2007, the Shetland Islands Council signed a partnership agreement with Scottish and Southern Energy for the Viking Wind Farm, a 200-turbine wind farm and subsea cable. This renewable energy project would produce about 600 megawatts and contribute about £20 million to the Shetland economy per year. The plan met with significant opposition within the islands, primarily resulting from the anticipated visual impact of the development. The PURE project in Unst is a research centre which uses a combination of wind power and fuel cells to create a wind hydrogen system. The project is run by the Unst Partnership, the local community's development trust.

A status report on hydrogen production in Shetland, published in September 2020, stated that Shetland Islands Council (SIC) had "joined a number of organisations and projects to drive forward plans to establish hydrogen as a future energy source for the isles and beyond". For example, it was a member of the Scottish Hydrogen Fuel Cell Association (SHFCA). The ORION project, previously named the Shetland Energy Hub, was underway; the plan was to create an energy hub that would use clean electricity in the development of "new technologies such as blue and green hydrogen generation".

In December 2020 the Scottish government released a hydrogen policy statement with plans for incorporating both blue and green hydrogen for use in heating, transportation and industry. The government also planned an investment of £100 million in the hydrogen sector "for the £180 million Emerging Energy Technologies Fund". Shetland Islands Council planned to obtain further specifics about the availability of funding. The government had already agreed that the production of "green" hydrogen from wind power near Sullom Voe Terminal was a valid plan. A December 2020 report stated that "the extensive terminal could also be used for direct refuelling of hydrogen-powered ships" and suggested that the fourth jetty at Sullom Voe "could be suitable for ammonia export".

Farming and textiles 
Farming is mostly concerned with the raising of Shetland sheep, known for their unusually fine wool.

Knitwear is important both to the economy and culture of Shetland, and the Fair Isle design is well known. However, the industry faces challenges due to plagiarism of the word "Shetland" by manufacturers operating elsewhere, and a certification trademark, "The Shetland Lady", has been registered.

Crofting, the farming of small plots of land on a legally restricted tenancy basis, is still practised and is viewed as a key Shetland tradition as well as an important source of income. Crops raised include oats and barley; however, the cold, windswept islands make for a harsh environment for most plants.

Media 
Shetland is served by a weekly local newspaper, The Shetland Times and the online Shetland News  with radio service being provided by BBC Radio Shetland and the commercial radio station SIBC.

Tourism 

Shetland is a popular destination for cruise ships, and in 2010 the Lonely Planet guide named Shetland as the sixth best region in the world for tourists seeking unspoilt destinations. The islands were described as "beautiful and rewarding" and the Shetlanders as "a fiercely independent and self-reliant bunch". Overall visitor expenditure was worth £16.4 million in 2006, in which year just under 26,000 cruise liner passengers arrived at Lerwick Harbour. This business has grown substantially with 109 cruise ships already booked in for 2019, representing over 107,000 passenger visits. In 2009, the most popular visitor attractions were the Shetland Museum, the RSPB reserve at Sumburgh Head, Bonhoga Gallery at Weisdale Mill and Jarlshof. Geopark Shetland (now Shetland UNESCO Global Geopark) was established by the Amenity Trust in 2009 to boost sustainable tourism to the islands.

According to the Promote Shetland organisation's website, tourism increased "by £12.6 million between 2017 and 2019 with more than half of visitors giving their trip a perfect rating".

Extremely popular in many countries, with five series having been filmed and aired by early 2021, Shetland (TV series) was inspired by the Ann Cleeves books about the fictional Detective Inspector Jimmy Perez. This has created an interest in Shetland and some tourists visit because they wish to see the places where the series is set and filmed. In 2018, series star Douglas Henshall said in an interview, "When we were there filming, there’s people from Australia and different parts of America who had come specifically because of the show ... It’s showing all over the world. Now you get a lot of people from Scandinavia on these noir tours".

An October 2018 report stated that 91,000 passengers from cruise ships arrived that year (a record high), an increase over the 70,000 in 2017. There was a drop in 2019 to "over 76,000 cruise ship passengers".

Effect of the COVID-19 pandemic
Tourism dropped significantly in 2020 (and into 2021) due to restrictions necessitated by the COVID-19 pandemic and the major decline in the number of cruise ships that continued to operate worldwide.

As of early February 2021, the Promote Shetland website was still stating this information: "At present, nobody should travel to Shetland from a Level 3 or Level 4 local authority area in Scotland, unless it's for essential purposes". That page reiterated the government recommendation "that people avoid any unnecessary travel between Scotland and England, Wales, or Northern Ireland".

A September 2020 report stated that "The Highlands and Islands region has been disproportionately impacted by the COVID-19 pandemic to date, when compared to Scotland and the UK as a whole". The tourism industry required short term support for "business survival and recovery" and that was expected to continue as the sector was "severely impacted for as long as physical distancing and travel restrictions". As of 31 December 2020, the usage of ferries and buses was restricted to those traveling for essential purposes. The Island Equivalent scheme was introduced in early 2021 by the Scottish government to financially assist hospitality and retail businesses "affected by Level 3 coronavirus restrictions". Previous schemes in 2020 included the Strategic Framework Business Fund and the Coronavirus Business Support Fund.

Quarries 
 Brindister: 
 Scord:  Scalloway 05
 Sullom: 
 Vatster:

Transport 

Transport between islands is primarily by ferry, and Shetland Islands Council operates various inter-island services. Shetland is also served by a domestic connection from Lerwick to Aberdeen in Scotland. This service, which takes about 12 hours, is operated by NorthLink Ferries. Some services also call at Kirkwall, Orkney, which increases the journey time between Aberdeen and Lerwick by 2 hours. There are plans for road tunnels to some of the islands, especially Bressay and Whalsay; however, it is hard to convince the UK or Scotland governments to finance them.

Loganair operates flights to parts of the UK Mainland up to ten times a day, the destinations being Kirkwall, Aberdeen, Inverness, Glasgow and Edinburgh. Operated by Directflight in partnership with Shetland Islands Council, it is devoted to inter-island flights from the Shetland Mainland to Fair Isle and Foula.

Scatsta Airport was an airport near Sullom Voe which allowed frequent charter flights from Aberdeen to transport oilfield workers. The airport closed on 30 June 2020.

Public bus services are operated in Mainland, Trondra, Burra, Unst and Yell, with scheduled dial-a-ride services available in Bressay and Fetlar. Buses also connect with ferries leading to Foula, Papa Stour, and Whalsay.

The archipelago is exposed to wind and tide, and there are numerous sites of wrecked ships. Lighthouses are sited as an aid to navigation at various locations.

Government 
The Shetland Islands Council is the local government authority for all the islands and is based in Lerwick Town Hall.

Shetland is sub-divided into 18 community council areas and into 12 civil parishes that are used for statistical purposes.

Education 
As of early 2021, Shetland had 22 primary schools, five junior high schools, and two high schools: Anderson High School and Brae High School.

Shetland College UHI is a partner of the University of the Highlands and Islands (UHI). UHI’s Centre for Rural Creativity partners with Shetland Arts Development Agency to provide courses on film, music and media up to Masters level at Mareel. The North Atlantic Fisheries College (NAFC) also operates in partnership with UHI offering "a range of training courses relevant to the maritime industries".

The Institute for Northern Studies, operated by UHI, provides "postgraduate teaching and research programmes"; one of the three locations is at Shetland.

Sport 
The Shetland Football Association oversees two divisions — a Premier League and a Reserve League — which are affiliated with the Scottish Amateur Football Association. Seasons take place during summer.

The islands are represented by the Shetland football team, which regularly competes in the Island Games.

Churches and religion 

The Reformation reached the archipelago in 1560. This was an apparently peaceful transition and there is little evidence of religious intolerance in Shetland's recorded history.

In the 2011 census, Shetland registered a higher proportion of people with no religion than the Scottish average. Nevertheless, a variety of religious denominations are represented in the islands.

The Methodist Church has a relatively high membership in Shetland, which is a District of the Methodist Church (with Scotland comprising a separate District).

The Church of Scotland had a Presbytery of Shetland that includes St. Columba's Church in Lerwick. On 1 June 2020 the Presbytery of Shetland merged with the Presbytery of Aberdeen becoming the Presbytery of Aberdeen and Shetland. In addition there was further church reorganisation in the islands with a series of church closures and all parishes merging into one, covering the whole of Shetland.

The Catholic population is served by the church of St. Margaret and the Sacred Heart in Lerwick. The parish is part of the Diocese of Aberdeen.

The Scottish Episcopal Church (part of the Anglican Communion) has regular worship at: St Magnus' Church, Lerwick; St Colman's Church, Burravoe; and the Chapel of Christ the Encompasser, Fetlar, the last of which is maintained by the Society of Our Lady of the Isles, the most northerly and remote Anglican religious order of nuns.

The Church of Jesus Christ of Latter-day Saints has a congregation in Lerwick. The former print works and offices of the local newspaper, The Shetland Times, has been converted into a chapel. Jehovah’s Witnesses has a congregation and Kingdom Hall in Lerwick.

Politics 
Shetland is represented in the House of Commons as part of the Orkney and Shetland constituency, which elects one Member of Parliament (MP). As of February 2021, and since 2001, the MP is Alistair Carmichael, a Liberal Democrat. He grew up on Islay, the son of hill farmers who raised sheep and cattle and worked at various occupations before running for election.

This seat has been held by the Liberal Democrats or their predecessors the Liberal Party since 1950, longer than any other seat in the United Kingdom.

In the Scottish Parliament the Shetland constituency elects one Member of the Scottish Parliament (MSP) by the first past the post system. Tavish Scott of the Scottish Liberal Democrats had held the seat since the creation of the Scottish Parliament in 1999. Beatrice Wishart MSP, also of the Scottish Liberal Democrats, was elected to replace Tavish Scott in August 2019. Shetland is within the Highlands and Islands electoral region.

The political composition of the Shetland Islands Council is 21 Independents and 1 Scottish National Party.

In the 2014 referendum on Scottish independence from the United Kingdom, Shetland voted to remain in the United Kingdom by the third largest margin of the 32 local authority areas, by 63.71% to 36.29% in favour of the Union.

In the 2016 United Kingdom European Union membership referendum, Shetland voted for the UK to remain an EU member state, with 56.5% voting to remain and 43.5% voting to leave. In comparison to the rest of Scotland, Shetland had lower-than-average support for remaining in the EU.

The Wir Shetland movement was set up in 2015 to campaign for greater autonomy. In September 2020, the Shetland Islands Council voted 18–2 to explore replacing the council with a new system of government which controls a fairer share of the islands revenue streams and has a greater influence over their own affairs, which could include very lucrative oil fields and fishing waters.

In 2022, as part of the Levelling Up White Paper, an "Island Forum" was proposed, which would allow local policymakers and residents in Shetland to work alongside their counterparts in Orkney, the Western Isles, Anglesey and the Isle of Wight on common issues, such as broadband connectivity, and provide a platform for them to communicate directly with the government on the challenges island communities face in terms of levelling up.

Flag 
Roy Grönneberg, who founded the local chapter of the Scottish National Party in 1966, designed the flag of Shetland in cooperation with Bill Adams to mark the 500th anniversary of the pawning of the islands from Norway to Scotland. The colours are identical to those of the flag of Scotland, but are shaped in the Nordic cross. After several unsuccessful attempts, including a plebiscite in 1985, the Lord Lyon King of Arms approved it as the official flag of Shetland in 2005.

Local culture and the arts 

After the islands were officially pawned from Norway to Scotland in 1472, several Scots families from the Scottish Lowlands emigrated to Shetland in the 16th and 17th centuries. Studies of the genetic makeup of the islands' population, however, indicate that Shetlanders are just under half Scandinavian in origin, and sizeable amounts of Scandinavian ancestry, both patrilineal and matrilineal, have been reported in Orkney (55%) and Shetland (68%). This combination is reflected in many aspects of local life. For example, almost every place name in use can be traced back to the Vikings. The Lerwick Up Helly Aa is one of several fire festivals held in Shetland annually in the middle of winter, starting on the last Tuesday of January. The festival is just over 100 years old in its present, highly organised form. Originally held to break up the long nights of winter and mark the end of Yule, the festival has become one celebrating the isles' heritage and includes a procession of men dressed as Vikings and the burning of a replica longship.

Shetland also competes in the biennial International Island Games, which it hosted in 2005.

The cuisine of Shetland is based on locally produced lamb, beef and seafood, some of it organic. The real ale-producing Valhalla Brewery is the most northerly in Britain. The Shetland Black is a variety of blue potato with a dark skin and indigo-coloured flesh markings.

Language 

The Norn language was a form of Old Norse spoken in the Shetland continued to be spoken until the 18th century. It was gradually replaced in Shetland by an insular dialect of Scots, known as Shetlandic, which is in turn being replaced by Scottish English. Although Norn was spoken for hundreds of years, it is now extinct and few written sources remain, although influences remain in the Insular Scots dialects. The Shetland dialect is used in local radio and dialect writing, and is kept alive by organisations such as Shetland Forwirds, and the Shetland Folk Society.

Music 
Shetland's culture and landscapes have inspired a variety of musicians, writers and film-makers. The Forty Fiddlers was formed in the 1950s to promote the traditional fiddle style, which is a vibrant part of local culture today. Notable exponents of Shetland folk music include Aly Bain, Jenna Reid, Fiddlers' Bid, and the late Tom Anderson and Peerie Willie Johnson. Thomas Fraser was a country musician who never released a commercial recording during his life, but whose work has become popular more than 20 years after his death in 1978.

The annual Shetland Folk Festival began in 1981 and is hosted on the first weekend of May.

Writers 
Walter Scott's 1822 novel The Pirate is set in "a remote part of Shetland", and was inspired by his 1814 visit to the islands. The name Jarlshof meaning "Earl's Mansion" is a coinage of his. Robert Cowie, a doctor born in Lerwick published the 1874 work entitled 

Hugh MacDiarmid, the Scots poet and writer, lived in Whalsay from the mid-1930s through 1942, and wrote many poems there, including a number that directly address or reflect the Shetland environment, such as "On A Raised Beach", which was inspired by a visit to West Linga. The 1975 novel North Star by Hammond Innes is largely set in Shetland and Raman Mundair's 2007 book of poetry A Choreographer's Cartography offers a British Asian perspective on the landscape. The Shetland Quartet by Ann Cleeves, who previously lived in Fair Isle, is a series of crime novels set around the islands. In 2013, her novel Red Bones became the basis of BBC crime drama television series Shetland.

Vagaland, who grew up in Walls, was arguably Shetland's finest poet of the 20th century. Haldane Burgess was a Shetland historian, poet, novelist, violinist, linguist and socialist, and Rhoda Bulter (1929–1994) is one of the best-known Shetland poets of recent times. Other 20th- and 21st-century poets and novelists include Christine De Luca, Robert Alan Jamieson who grew up in Sandness, the late Lollie Graham of Veensgarth, Stella Sutherland of Bressay, the late William J. Tait from Yell and Laureen Johnson.

There is one monthly magazine in production: Shetland. The quarterly The New Shetlander, founded in 1947, is said to be Scotland's longest-running literary magazine. For much of the later 20th century, it was the major vehicle for the work of local writers — and of others, including early work by George Mackay Brown.

Films and television 
Michael Powell made The Edge of the World in 1937, a dramatisation based on the true story of the evacuation of the last 36 inhabitants of the remote island of St Kilda on 29 August 1930. Undaunted, he made the film over four months during the summer of 1936 in Foula and the film transposes these events to Shetland. Forty years later, the documentary Return to the Edge of the World was filmed, capturing a reunion of cast and crew of the film as they revisited the island in 1978.

A number of other films have been made on or about Shetland including A Crofter's Life in Shetland (1932), A Shetland Lyric (1934), Devil's Gate (2003) and It's Nice Up North (2006), a comedy documentary by Graham Fellows. The Screenplay film festival takes place annually in Mareel, a cinema, music and education venue.

The BBC One television series Shetland, a crime drama, is set in the islands and is based on the book series by Ann Cleeves. The programme is filmed partly in Shetland and partly on the Scottish mainland.

Wildlife 

Shetland has three national nature reserves, at the seabird colonies of Hermaness and Noss, and at Keen of Hamar to preserve the serpentine flora. There are a further 81 SSSIs, which cover 66% or more of the land surfaces of Fair Isle, Papa Stour, Fetlar, Noss, and Foula. Mainland has 45 separate sites.

Flora 
The landscape in Shetland is marked by the grazing of sheep and the harsh conditions have limited the total number of plant species to about 400. Native trees such as rowan and crab apple are only found in a few isolated places such as cliffs and loch islands. The flora is dominated by Arctic-alpine plants, wild flowers, moss and lichen. Spring squill, buck's-horn plantain, Scots lovage, roseroot and sea campion are abundant, especially in sheltered places. Shetland mouse-ear (Cerastium nigrescens) is an endemic flowering plant found only in Shetland. It was first recorded in 1837 by botanist Thomas Edmondston. Although reported from two other sites in the nineteenth century, it currently grows only on two serpentine hills in the island of Unst. The nationally scarce oysterplant is found in several islands and the British Red Listed bryophyte Thamnobryum alopecurum has also been recorded. Listed marine algae include: Polysiphonia fibrillosa (Dillwyn) Sprengel and Polysiphonia atlantica Kapraun and J.Norris, Polysiphonia brodiaei (Dillwyn) Sprengel, Polysiphonia elongata (Hudson) Sprengel, Polysiphonia elongella, Harvey. The Shetland Monkeyflower is unique to Shetland and is a mutation of the Monkeyflower (mimulus guttatus) introduced to Shetland in the 19th century.

Fauna 

Shetland has numerous seabird colonies. Birds found in the islands include Atlantic puffin, storm-petrel, red-throated diver, northern gannet and great skua (locally called "bonxie"). Numerous rarities have also been recorded including black-browed albatross and snow goose. A single pair of snowy owls bred in Fetlar from 1967 to 1975. The Shetland wren, Fair Isle wren, and Shetland starling are subspecies endemic to Shetland. There are also populations of various moorland birds such as curlew, lapwing, snipe and golden plover.

One of the early ornithologists that wrote about the wealth of birdlife in Shetland was Edmund Selous (1857–1934) in his book The Bird Watcher in the Shetlands (1905). He wrote extensively about the gulls and terns, about the arctic skuas, the black guillemots and many other birds (and the seals) of the islands.

The geographical isolation and recent glacial history of Shetland have resulted in a depleted mammalian fauna and the brown rat and house mouse are two of only three species of rodent present in the islands. The Shetland field mouse is the third and the archipelago's fourth endemic subspecies, of which there are three varieties in Yell, Foula, and Fair Isle. They are variants of Apodemus sylvaticus and archaeological evidence suggests that this species was present during the Middle Iron Age (around 200 BC to 400 CE). It is possible that Apodemus was introduced from Orkney where a population has existed since at the least the Bronze Age.

Domesticated animals 

There is a variety of indigenous breeds, of which the diminutive Shetland pony is probably the best known, as well as being an important part of the Shetland farming tradition. The first written record of the pony was in 1603 in the Court Books of Shetland and, for its size, it is the strongest of all the horse breeds. Others are the Shetland Sheepdog or "Sheltie", the endangered Shetland cattle and Shetland goose and the Shetland sheep which is believed to have originated prior to 1000 AD. The Grice was a breed of semi-domesticated pig that had a habit of attacking lambs. It became extinct sometime between the middle of the nineteenth century and the 1930s.

See also

Lists 
 List of counties of the United Kingdom
 List of islands in Scotland
 List of populated places in Shetland

About Shetland 
 Mavis Grind
 Udal law

Others 
 
 Battle of Florvåg
 Rögnvald Kali Kolsson
 Timeline of prehistoric Scotland
 Prehistoric Scotland
 Constitutional status of Orkney, Shetland and the Western Isles

Notes

References

General references 

 Armit, I.; (2003), Towers in the North: The Brochs of Scotland, Stroud, Tempus, 
 Ballin Smith, B. and Banks, I.; (ed. 2002), In the Shadow of the Brochs, the Iron Age in Scotland, Stroud, Tempus, 
 Barrett, James H.; "The Norse in Scotland" in Brink, Stefan, (ed. 2008), The Viking World, Abingdon, Routledge, 
 Clapperton, Chalmers M.; (ed. 1983), Scotland: A New Study, Newton Abbott, David & Charles
 Gillen, Con; (2003), Geology and landscapes of Scotland, Harpenden, Terra Publishing, 
 Graham-Campbell, James; (1999), Cultural Atlas of the Viking World, Facts On File, 
 Fleming, Andrew; (2005), St. Kilda and the Wider World: Tales of an Iconic Island, Windgather Press, 
 Gammeltoft, Peder; (2010), "Shetland and Orkney Island-Names – A Dynamic Group ", Northern Lights, Northern Words, Selected Papers from the FRLSU Conference, Kirkwall 2009, edited by Robert McColl Millar
 
 
 Hunter, James; (2000), Last of the Free: A History of the Highlands and Islands of Scotland, Edinburgh, Mainstream, 
 Jones, Charles; (ed. 1997), The Edinburgh history of the Scots language, Edinburgh University Press, 
 Keay, J. & Keay, J.; (1994), Collins Encyclopaedia of Scotland, London, HarperCollins, 
 Noble, Gordon; Poller, Tessa & Verrill, Lucy; (2008), Scottish Odysseys: The Archaeology of Islands, Stroud, Tempus, 
 Omand, Donald; (ed. 2003), The Orkney Book, Edinburgh, Birlinn, 
 Nicolson, James R.; (1972), Shetland, Newton Abbott, David & Charles
 Sandnes, Berit; (2003), From Starafjall to Starling Hill: An investigation of the formation and development of Old Norse place-names in Orkney , (pdf), Doctoral Dissertation, NTU Trondheim
 Schei, Liv Kjørsvik; (2006), The Shetland Isles, Grantown-on-Spey, Colin Baxter Photography, 
 Scottish Natural Heritage, (2008), The Story of Hermaness National Nature Reserve, Lerwick
 Shetland Islands Council, (2005), "Shetland In Statistics 2005", (pdf), Economic Development Unit, Lerwick, Retrieved 19 March 2011
 Shetland Islands Council, (2010), "Shetland in Statistics 2010", (pdf), Economic Development Unit, Lerwick, Retrieved 6 March 2011
 Thomson, William P. L.; (2008), The New History of Orkney, Edinburgh, Birlinn, 
 Turner, Val; (1998), Ancient Shetland, London, B. T. Batsford/Historic Scotland, 
 Watson, William J.; (1994), The Celtic Place-Names of Scotland, Edinburgh, Birlinn, First published 1926.

Further reading 
 
Shepherd, Mike (2015). Oil Strike North Sea: A first-hand history of North Sea oil. Luath Press.

External links 

 
 Shetland Islands Council
 www.shetland.org
 shetlopedia.com, – The Online Shetland Encyclopedia
 HIE Area Profile – Shetland (PDF file) from Highlands and Islands Enterprise
 Shetlink – Shetland's Online Community
 National Library of Scotland: Scottish Screen Archive (selection of archive films about Shetland)

 
Council areas of Scotland
Counties of Scotland
Former Norwegian colonies
Former Danish colonies
Highlands and Islands of Scotland
Lieutenancy areas of Scotland
National scenic areas of Scotland
Northern Isles
Kingdom of Norway (872–1397)
Archipelagoes of Scotland
Archipelagoes of the Atlantic Ocean
Counties of the United Kingdom (1801–1922)